Vijay High School (VHS) Mubarak Nagar, Nizamabad, Telangana, India, and Vijay High School (VHS) Mamidipalli, Armoor, Telangana, India, are the Prestigious Institutions for the Privileged. The Secretary and the Promoter is Amrutha Latha.

Vijay Group of Institutions
Vijay Rural Engineering College, Manikbhandar, Nizamabad, established in 1997
Srinivas Reddy Institute of Technology, Municipalli, Armoor, established in 2001
Vijay Institute of Technology and Sciences, Markal, Kamareddy, established in 2004

See also
Vijay Rural Engineering College
Education in India
List of schools in India
List of institutions of higher education in Telangana

References

External links 

Education in Nizamabad, Telangana
High schools and secondary schools in Telangana
Educational institutions established in 1981
1981 establishments in Andhra Pradesh